Charles Griffith (born 18 February 1963) is a Venezuelan judoka. He competed in the men's middleweight event at the 1988 Summer Olympics.

References

1963 births
Living people
Venezuelan male judoka
Olympic judoka of Venezuela
Judoka at the 1988 Summer Olympics
Place of birth missing (living people)
Pan American Games medalists in judo
Pan American Games silver medalists for Venezuela
Pan American Games bronze medalists for Venezuela
Judoka at the 1987 Pan American Games
Judoka at the 1991 Pan American Games
Medalists at the 1987 Pan American Games
Medalists at the 1991 Pan American Games
20th-century Venezuelan people